Fincke coat of arms (also Finckenstein coat of arms or Finke coat of arms) are a German coat of arms, also used in Poland. It is used by the German and Prussian Finck von Finckenstein family as well as the Lniski family from Elnis.

History

It is the coat of arms that belonged to the German family Finke that joined the Teutonic Knights before 1400 and moved to Prussia.

Blazon

Notable bearers

Notable bearers of this coat of arms include:

 Finck von Finckenstein

See also

 Polish heraldry
 Heraldry
 Coat of arms
 List of Polish nobility coats of arms

References 
 

Polish coats of arms